Modrzew may refer to the following places:
Modrzew, Łódź Voivodeship (central Poland)
Modrzew, Gostynin County in Masovian Voivodeship (east-central Poland)
Modrzew, Siedlce County in Masovian Voivodeship (east-central Poland)